East Church, Inverness is a Category B listed parish church in the Church of Scotland in Inverness.

History
The church opened as a chapel of ease in 1798 but was rebuilt in 1852-1853. The street frontage was added in 1897-1898 by Ross & Macbeth.

East Church left the Church of Scotland during the disruption of 1843 and became Inverness East Free Church. In 1900 it joined with the United Presbyterian Church of Scotland to form the United Free Church of Scotland and became a United Free church.  In 1929, with many other United Free churches, Inverness East Church, returned to the Church of Scotland.

The position of Minister is vacant. The Church's parish includes some of the city centre of Inverness, as well as the Longman, Drakies and Raigmore areas. Within the Raigmore estate, they have an outreach post known as 'The Shack' which was a former rent office for the estate. It is used as a drop in for those in need, as well as being the base for a lot of the work the congregation does in this area of the parish.

References

External links
Inverness East Website
'The Shack' Facebook Page
Inverness Presbytery 

Church of Scotland churches in Scotland
East Church
Category B listed buildings in Highland (council area)
Churches completed in 1853
Rebuilt churches in the United Kingdom
19th-century Church of Scotland church buildings